Melanotis is a genus of bird in the family Mimidae. 
It contains the following species:
 Blue mockingbird (Melanotis caerulescens)
 Blue-and-white mockingbird (Melanotis hypoleucus)

Etymology
The word Melanotis is derived from the Ancient Greek roots melano-/μελανο- "black" and ot-/ὠτ- "ear".

Description
The two Melanotis species are the world's most brightly colored mockingbirds.

References

 
Mimidae
Mockingbirds
Bird genera
Taxa named by Charles Lucien Bonaparte
Taxonomy articles created by Polbot